Betula maximowicziana, the monarch birch, is a species of birch tree native to the Kuril Islands and northern to central Japan. It is a valuable timber tree in Japan. It is also grown as an ornamental for its bark in Japan, Europe and a few places in North America, but has had limited acceptance due to lack of uniformity.

References

maximowicziana
Flora of the Kuril Islands
Flora of Japan
Ornamental trees